Club Deportivo Atlético Comalapa  is a Salvadoran professional football club based in Chalatenango, El Salvador.

Honours
 Tercera División Salvadoreño: 2
2012 Apertura, 2014 Clausura

Current squad
As of:

List of coaches
In its history, Comalapa have had 6 managers. The first was the Salvadoran Ricardo Serrano. Serrano was the first Comalapa manager to achieve an honour when, in 2012, the club won the Tercera División. Serrano has the honour of being the club's longest-serving manager having spent two years with the club from 2012 to 2014. Serrano is followed by Uruguayan Pablo Quiñonez who spent one season with the club between 2015 and 2016.

References

External links
 ceroacero.es (Spanish)
 Atlético Comalapa - Chalatenango, El Salvador

Football clubs in El Salvador